Territorial Assembly elections were held in Ubangi-Shari on 31 March 1957. The first and second college system for giving separate seats to Europeans and Africans was scrapped, and all 50 seats elected by universal suffrage. The result was a victory for the Movement for the Social Evolution of Black Africa led by Barthélémy Boganda, which won all 50 seats.

Results

References

Ubangi
Elections in the Central African Republic
1957 in Ubangi-Shari
Election and referendum articles with incomplete results